The Medical University of Warsaw (Polish name: Warszawski Uniwersytet Medyczny, Latin name: Universitas Medica Varsoviensis) is one of the oldest and the largest medical school in Poland. The first academic department of medicine was created in 1809. It is one of the most prestigious schools of medical science affiliated with a number of large hospitals in Poland.

The academic staff of the Medical University of Warsaw are recognized nationally and internationally for their contributions to the research and practice in medicine. Many of them hold the prestigious posts of National Medical Consultants.

The Medical University of Warsaw provides general and specialty training at both undergraduate and postgraduate levels. Students learn at five clinical teaching hospitals who provide general and tertiary medical care to patients. Students and staff also conduct scientific and clinical research at these hospitals as well as are involved in a number of clinical academic departments located in other hospitals in Warsaw.

MUW offers 19 degree programs including 3 full-time degree programs in English: Dentistry, Medicine, Pharmacy.

Faculties
Faculty of Medicine
Faculty of Dental Medicine 
Faculty of Medical Sciences
Faculty of Pharmacy
Faculty of Health Sciences

University hospitals
 Centralny Szpital Kliniczny UCK WUM, Banacha Street
 Samodzielny Publiczny Kliniczny Szpital Okulistyczny, Marszałkowska Street
 Dziecięcy Szpital Kliniczny m. Józefa Polikarpa Brudzińskiego UCK WUM, Zwirki i Wigury Street
 Szpital Kliniczny Dzieciątka Jezus UCK WUM, Lindleya Street
 Szpital Kliniczny im. ks. Anny Mazowieckiej, Karowa Street

Science and research
The Medical University of Warsaw has managed to establish a recognized international position in research, both in clinical and theoretical medicine. The University has scientific research cooperation with many universities and research institutions in Europe, especially Germany, France, Sweden, Netherlands, Austria and Great Britain. At present this cooperation is also being developed with other foreign partners from Europe, USA, Canada  and Asia – China and Japan.
Research projects are conducted and developed in clinical medicine in: oncology, nephrology, transplantology, cardiology, hematology, endocrinology, gastroenterology, dermatology, neurology, pulmonology, ophthalmology, urology, as well as in theoretical medicine (histology, immunology, anatomy, biology, pharmacology and physiology).

Rectors

 1950–1955: Franciszek Czubalski
 1955–1962: Marcin Kacprzak
 1962–1972: Bolesław Górnicki
 1972–1979: Szczęsny Leszek Zgliczyński
 1979–1981: Jerzy Szczerbań
 1981–1987: Jan Nielubowicz
 1987–1990: Bogdan Pruszyński
 1990–1996: Tadeusz Tołłoczko
 1996–1999: Andrzej Górski
 1999–2005: Janusz Piekarczyk
 2005–2008: Leszek Pączek
 2008–2016: Marek Krawczyk
 2016–2020: Mirosław Wielgoś
 from 2020: Zbigniew Gaciong

References

External links
 Official website